Folinsbee is a surname. Notable people with the surname include:

John Fulton Folinsbee (1892–1972), American painter
Robert Folinsbee (1917–2008), Canadian geologist

Other
 187679 Folinsbee, a minor planet orbiting between Mars and Jupiters orbits